The Hardys Ride High (1939) is the sixth film of Metro-Goldwyn-Mayer's Andy Hardy series.

Plot summary

Judge Hardy learns that he has inherited two million dollars. He and his family travel to Detroit to claim the inheritance and they experience various difficulties adjusting to lives as millionaires.

Cast

 Lewis Stone as Judge James K. Hardy
 Mickey Rooney as Andy Hardy
 Cecilia Parker as Marian Hardy
 Fay Holden as Mrs. Emily Hardy
 Ann Rutherford as Polly Benedict
 Sara Haden as Mildred 'Aunt Milly' Forrest
 Virginia Grey as Consuela MacNish
 Minor Watson as Mr. Terry B. Archer
 John 'Dusty' King as Philip 'Phil' Westcott
 John T. Murray as Don Davis, the Druggist
 Halliwell Hobbes as Dobbs, the Butler
 George Irving as Mr. Jonas Bronell
 Aileen Pringle as Miss Booth, Dress Saleslady
 Marsha Hunt as Susan Bowen
 Donald Briggs as Caleb Bowen

References

External links
 The Hardys Ride High at IMDb
 The Hardys Ride High at TCMDB
 
 

1939 films
1939 comedy films
American comedy films
American black-and-white films
Films directed by George B. Seitz
Films set in Detroit
Metro-Goldwyn-Mayer films
Films with screenplays by William Ludwig
1930s English-language films
1930s American films